Douglas Rougvie (born 24 May 1956) is a Scottish former footballer, who played mainly for Aberdeen and Chelsea. Rougvie played in one international match for Scotland, in 1983.

Playing career

Aberdeen
A hard-tackling and committed defender, Rougvie played for Aberdeen between 1975 and 1984, one of the most successful periods in their history. After debuting for Aberdeen in an away friendly against Persepolis of Iran in summer '74, he made 279 appearances (28 as substitute) and scored 21 goals, winning the Scottish league championship in 1979–80 and 1983–84, the Scottish Cup in 1982, 1983 and  1984, the UEFA Cup Winners' Cup in 1983 and the European Super Cup in 1983.

Rougvie was the first player to be sent off in a Scottish League Cup final in 1979.

While an Aberdeen player, Rougvie played one game for Scotland in 1983.

Chelsea

Rougvie signed for newly promoted English side Chelsea in 1984 for £150,000, a team which included the likes of Kerry Dixon, Pat Nevin and David Speedie. He made his debut for the club in the opening game of the new season against Arsenal at Highbury, at one point managing to floor Arsenal's Viv Anderson with a crunching challenge. Though initially a regular in the side, Rougvie's lack of pace and often reckless tackling were to hamper his progress with the club.

During a League Cup quarter-final match with Sheffield Wednesday at Hillsborough, Chelsea came from 0–3 down to lead 4–3, only for Rougvie to concede a last minute penalty with a careless challenge and cost the team victory. He lost his place in the side towards the end of the 1984–85 season and thereafter only featured sporadically, though he did play in Chelsea's Full Members Cup win over Manchester City at Wembley; despite scoring an own goal, his team won 5–4. He was later sent off within ten minutes of the kick-off in a match against Wimbledon for punching Dave Beasant and headbutting Carlton Fairweather.

Brighton and Hove Albion

He was sold to Brighton and Hove Albion in the summer of 1987 for £73,000 having made 100 appearances for Chelsea and scored three goals.

Later career

He later had brief spells with Fulham, Shrewsbury Town and Dunfermline, as well as a stint managing Scottish Part Time professional side, Montrose before playing for, and subsequently managing Huntly in the Scottish Highland Football League.

Rougvie quit playing in 1996 to solely focus on being Huntly manager. After his departure in October 1997, he made an swift return with Cove Rangers. His tenure last just over year. 

Rougvie made a brief comeback to play for Buckie Thistle and Kincorth Amateurs. He fully retired at 45 years old.

Career statistics

Club

International

Honours

Player 
Aberdeen
 UEFA Cup Winners' Cup: 1982–83
UEFA Super Cup: 1983
 Scottish Premier Division: 1979–80, 1983–84
 Scottish Cup: 1981–82, 1982–83, 1983–84
Aberdeenshire Cup: 1980–81

Chelsea
Full Members' Cup: 1985–86

Brighton
 Football League Third Division: Promoted 1987–88

Montrose
 Scottish Second Division: Promoted 1990–91

Huntly
 Highland League: 1995–96
 Highland League Cup: 1995–96
 Aberdeenshire Cup: 1995–96

Manager 
Montrose
 Scottish Second Division: Promoted 1990–91

Huntly
 Highland League: 1995–96, 1996–97
 Highland League Cup: 1995–96
 Aberdeenshire Cup: 1995–96
 Qualifying Cup North: 1996–97

Individual 

 Aberdeen FC Hall of Fame: Inducted, 2019

References

1956 births
Living people
People from Ballingry
Scottish footballers
Scotland international footballers
Aberdeen F.C. players
Chelsea F.C. players
Brighton & Hove Albion F.C. players
Shrewsbury Town F.C. players
Fulham F.C. players
Dunfermline Athletic F.C. players
Montrose F.C. players
Huntly F.C. players
Scottish Football League players
English Football League players
Scottish football managers
Montrose F.C. managers
Footballers from Fife
Scottish Football League managers
Association football defenders
Cove Rangers F.C. managers